Minuscule 11 (in the Gregory-Aland numbering), ε 297 (Soden). It is a Greek minuscule manuscript of the New Testament in two small volumes. The first volume has 230 leaves, the second volume has 274 leaves parchment. Palaeographically it has been assigned to the 14th-century.

Description 

The codex contains the complete text of the four Gospels. The text is written in one column per page, 16 lines per page, in neat letters.

There is also another division according to the shorter the Ammonian Sections (in Mark 233 sections, the last in 16:7), whose numbers are placed at the margin, with references to the Eusebian Canons (written below Ammonian Section numbers).

It contains the Eusebian Canon tables, placed before each Gospel, and portraits of the Evangelists.

Text 

The Greek text of the codex is a representative of the Byzantine text-type, but there are some Alexandrian readings. Kurt Aland placed it in Category V.

According to the Claremont Profile Method it represents textual family Πb in Luke 1, and Kx in Luke 10 and Luke 20.

History 

The manuscript was dated by C. R. Gregory to the 12th century. Currently it is dated by the INTF to the 14th-century.

It was in private hands, and belonged to the Archbishop of Reims Le Tellier (1671–1710), like codices 10, 13. 
It was used by Kuster in his edition of the Greek New Testament (as Paris 4). The manuscript was examined by Scholz. It was examined and described by Paulin Martin. C. R. Gregory saw the manuscript in 1885.

The codex is located at the Bibliothèque nationale de France (Gr. 121.122) in Paris, which has images of the entire manuscript on its website.

See also 

 List of New Testament minuscules
 Textual criticism

References

Further reading 

 

Greek New Testament minuscules
14th-century biblical manuscripts
Bibliothèque nationale de France collections